George Alderink (May 9, 1889 – August 5, 1977) was an American businessman and politician.

Alderink was born in Michigan. He went to Holland Business College and to Northland College. Alderink lived in Pease, Mille Lacs County, Minnesota with his wife and family and was a merchant. Alderink serves as the mayor of Pease, as the Peace village treasurer, and the Pease postmaster. He also served on the Pease Village Council and on the Pease School Board. Alderink served in the Minnesota House of Representatives from 1955 to 1958.

References

1889 births
1977 deaths
People from Michigan
People from Mille Lacs County, Minnesota
Northland College (Wisconsin) alumni
Businesspeople from Minnesota
Mayors of places in Minnesota
Minnesota city council members
Minnesota postmasters
School board members in Minnesota
Members of the Minnesota House of Representatives